The Canadian Centre for Diversity (originally called the Canadian Council for Christians and Jews.) was founded in 1947 to address issues of antisemitism and promote interfaith dialogue. The mandate expanded in subsequent years to focus on addressing issues related to racism, and religious discrimination in Canadian society. Their primary focus was on providing school programs to educate students on issues related to bullying, bias and discrimination. The CCCJ changed its name in 2008 to the Canadian Centre for Diversity to be more reflective of its broader mandate

Over the years, the CCD was responsible for delivering educational initiatives that worked to educate Canadians on the value of inclusion of people from different racial, ethnic and religious identities.

One of their largest initiatives was the March of Remembrance and Hope. The March is a program that takes University and College students to Germany and Poland to witness the historical sites of the genocide of World War II. The March is still run today by the March of the Living Canada.

In September 2013, the board of directors of the CCD announced that it was shutting its doors due to a lack of ongoing funding. Subsequently, CCD announced in January 2014 that they would merge with the Canadian Institute of Diversity and Inclusion

In April 2015 the CCD and CIDI changed their name to the Canadian Centre for Diversity and Inclusion.

References 

Interfaith organizations
Organizations established in 1947
Educational organizations based in Canada
Jews and Judaism in Canada